The Stresa Front was an agreement made in Stresa, a town on the banks of Lake Maggiore in Italy, between French prime minister Pierre-Étienne Flandin (with Pierre Laval), British prime minister Ramsay MacDonald, and Italian prime minister Benito Mussolini on April 14, 1935. Formally called the Final Declaration of the Stresa Conference, its aim was to reaffirm the Locarno Treaties and to declare that the independence of Austria "would continue to inspire their common policy". The signatories also agreed to resist any future attempt by the Germans to change the Treaty of Versailles. Pat Buchanan in Churchill, Hitler and the Unnecessary War, wrote that "the Stresa Front was the most important attempt to stop Hitler before the start of WW2". However, the Stresa Front began to collapse after the United Kingdom signed the Anglo-German Naval Agreement in June 1935 in which Germany was given permission to increase the size of its navy. It broke down completely within two to three months of the initial agreement, just after the Italian invasion of Abyssinia.

Background
The Stresa Front was triggered by Germany's declaration of its intention to build up an air force, increase the size of the army to 36 divisions (500,000 men) and introduce conscription, in March 1935. All of these actions were direct violations of the Treaty of Versailles, which limited the size of the German Army to 100,000 men, forbade conscription in Germany and prohibited a German air force. 

Mussolini thought that the signing of the Stresa Front would mean that the United Kingdom and France would not interfere in the Abyssinian crisis.

Conference

Even though the increasingly belligerent Germany dominated discussions within the conference room, Mussolini was most clever outside. With Britain, he discussed plans to pursue his aim of making Italy 'great, respected and feared' through the invasion and conquest of Abyssinia and create an all-powerful empire. Mussolini made sure not to discuss his expansionist plans within the confines of the conference itself, as he knew of the risk of the Western democracies issuing a veto over it. Furthermore, Mussolini could not risk the conference being sidetracked from its main aims: reaffirming Locarno and opposing any more breaches of international agreements.

Mussolini got his way, and his plans to invade Abyssinia were not brought up. He took that silence as acquiescence to his colonial war, and so he launched his invasion of Abyssinia in October 1935. That was the turning point for Mussolini, as he drifted away from Britain and France and toward Germany.

Dissolution

The front collapsed completely with the Italian invasion of Abyssinia.

Mussolini had long held ambitions of controlling Abyssinia and was enraged by the signing of the Anglo-German Naval Agreement without being informed beforehand. Mussolini had held back on his invasion plans to avoid alienating his allies, especially since Ethiopia bordered French Somaliland and British Somaliland. However, he felt betrayed by Britain and so decided that there was no reason against the invasion. He also believed that the agreement violated the Stresa Front.

On January 6, 1936, Mussolini told German Ambassador Ulrich von Hassell that he would not object to Germany taking Austria as a satellite state if it maintained its independence. On 22 February, Mussolini then agreed to Hitler's remilitarization of the Rhineland and stated that Italy would not honour the Locarno Treaty if the remilitarization occurred.

See also
Anschluss annexation of Austria by Germany in 1938

References

External links
 Text of the agreement

French Third Republic
Modern history of Italy
1935 in Italy
1935 in France
1935 in the United Kingdom
1935 in international relations
France–United Kingdom relations
France–Italy relations
Italy–United Kingdom relations
1935 treaties